Umut Akkoyun (born 10 July 2000) is a Turkish tennis player.

Akkoyun has a career high ATP singles ranking of 2005 achieved on 4 January 2021. He also has a career high ATP doubles ranking of 675 achieved on 4 January 2021. Akkoyun has won 1 ITF doubles title on the ITF Men's World Tennis Tour.

Akkoyun made his main drew debut at the 2021 Antalya Open in the doubles draw, receiving a wildcard alongside Mert Naci Türker.

References

External links
 
 

2000 births
Living people
Turkish male tennis players